Tswaing Local Municipality is a local municipality consisting of the towns of Delareyville, Sannieshof and Ottosdal in the Ngaka Modiri Molema District Municipality situated in the North West Province of South Africa.

Main places
The 2011 census divided the municipality into the following main places:

Politics 

The municipal council consists of twenty-eight members elected by mixed-member proportional representation. Fourteen councillors are elected by first-past-the-post voting in fourteen wards, while the remaining fourteen are chosen from party lists so that the total number of party representatives is proportional to the number of votes received. In the election of 1 November 2021 the African National Congress (ANC) won a majority of nineteen seats on the council.

The following table shows the results of the election.

References

Local municipalities of the Ngaka Modiri Molema District Municipality